Joseph Anthony Zasadzinski (born November 16, 1958), also known as "Joey Z" is an American chemical engineer from the University of California, Santa Barbara. He was awarded the status of Fellow in the American Physical Society, after he  was nominated by his Division of Biological Physics in 2008, for "applying physical principles of self-assembly, directed assembly and bio-mimicry to create well-controlled lipid structures such as unilamellar vesicles and "vesosomes" for biomedical applications such as targeted drug-delivery vehicles and treatments for respiratory diseases, and for developing new microscopies." Zasadzinski currently works in the Department of Chemical Engineering and Materials Science at the University of Minnesota, Twin Cities.

References 

Fellows of the American Physical Society
Living people
1958 births
American chemical engineers
People from Butler, Pennsylvania
American people of Polish descent